Christian Kwesi Annan (born 3 May 1978) is a former Ghanaian-born Hong Kong professional footballer who played as a striker or left winger.

He is renowned in Hong Kong for his high pace and dribbling skill.

Club career

Eastern

Christian Annan arrived in Hong Kong to continue his football career in 2005. Unfortunately, he arrived at a time when most clubs in the First Division had already finished their foreign player signings, and so he joined Eastern, a Second Division club instead.

With 14 goals in 11 matches, including a hat trick against Tai Po, Annan successfully gained the attention of his then opponent. When Tai Po had successfully obtained their promotion status after the 2005–06 season, they signed Annan immediately.

Tai Po
Although he did not have the same impact in front of goal when compared to his time in the Second Division, Annan bagged 6 goals in 21 matches and became Tai Po's top scorer (along with defender Joel), helping the team to successfully avoid relegation. His performances were also thrown into the limelight with his selection into the Hong Kong League XI for the Lunar New Year Cup 2007. With only a brief appearance in the first match against Jamaica, Annan started the next match against Australia U-23, was fouled in the box, gaining a penalty for his team which ultimately tied the match (penalty scored by Keith Gumbs) in injury time.

His contribution on Tai Po has been further rewarded: he was selected into the 2006–07 Squad of the Year in the Hong Kong Footballer Awards.

In season 2007–2008, Annan kept performing and being selected into the first squad of Hong Kong League XI for the Lunar New Year Cup 2008. He only dropped out of the final selection due to the overload of attacking players. He scored 7 goals in the season, being named the second top league scorer of the team along with striking partner Betine, behind Dega.

In the 2011–12 season, on 18 September 2011, Annan appeared as a second-half substitute and scored twice against Kitchee, but Tai Po still lost the game, 4–2.

Kitchee
On 9 June 2013, Annan joined Kitchee on a free transfer along with his former Tai Po strike partner Alex. On 3 September 2013, Annan made his debut for Kitchee in a 6–2 victory against Sun Hei. On 19 October 2013, Annan scored his first goal for Kitchee by netting the winner in a 1–0 victory against Yokohama FC Hong Kong.

On 12 July 2017, Annan was recalled from loan after he spent the 2016–17 season at Pegasus.

Hong Kong League XI
On 18 July 2010, Annan was selected into Hong Kong League Selection against Birmingham City in the Hong Kong Stadium. He scored a goal in the match and was the MVP of the match. After the match, it was rumoured that the manager of Birmingham City Alex McLeish was interested in signing Annan.

Hoi King
On 20 August 2018, Annan was sent on loan to fellow HKPL side Hoi King.

Rangers
On 28 August 2019, Annan joined Rangers.
He played 17 matches for Rangers during the 2019–20 season including league and cup games, before the HKPL was suspended from mid of March 2020 due to the COVID-19 pandemic.

Tai Po
In August 2021, Annan returned to Tai Po.

International career
On 12 February 2014, after residing in Hong Kong for more than 7 years, Annan was granted the HKSAR passport, making him eligible for the Hong Kong national football team.

On 6 September 2014, Annan made his international debut for Hong Kong in the 2015 AFC Asian Cup qualifiers against Vietnam.

Annan scored his first international goal for Hong Kong against Bhutan on 11 June 2015 in a 2018 FIFA World Cup qualifier.

Honours

Club
Tai Po
 Hong Kong Senior Shield: 2012–13
 Hong Kong FA Cup: 2008–09

Kitchee
Hong Kong Premier League: 2014–15, 2017–18
Hong Kong First Division: 2013–14
Hong Kong FA Cup: 2014–15, 2017–18
Hong Kong Sapling Cup: 2017–18
Hong Kong League Cup: 2014–15, 2015–16

Individual
 Hong Kong Top Footballers: 2006–07

Career statistics

Club
As of 12 July 2017

International
As of 5 March 2014

International goals
Scores and results list Hong Kong's goal tally first.

Personal life
Annan's wife, Irene, is a Hong Konger. The couple have a daughter named Precious

References

External links
 

1978 births
Living people
Ghanaian footballers
Hong Kong footballers
Hong Kong international footballers
Ghanaian emigrants to Hong Kong
Association football forwards
Eastern Sports Club footballers
Tai Po FC players
Kitchee SC players
TSW Pegasus FC players
Hoi King SA players
Hong Kong Rangers FC players
Yuen Long FC players
Hong Kong First Division League players
Hong Kong Premier League players
Expatriate footballers in Hong Kong
Footballers at the 2014 Asian Games
Naturalized footballers of Hong Kong
Asian Games competitors for Hong Kong
Hong Kong League XI representative players